Canadian singer and songwriter Lights has released six studio albums, three acoustic albums, eight extended plays, 39 singles (including 10 as a featured artist and two as part of a supergroup), and 30 music videos. Lights began her career as a songwriter, penning songs for the television series Instant Star. She released a self-titled EP in 2008 on the independent record label Underground Operations. Two singles, "Drive My Soul" and "February Air", were released from the EP: "Drive My Soul" reached number 18 on the Canadian singles chart and was certified gold by Music Canada (MC).

Lights' debut studio album, The Listening, was released in September 2009. It reached number seven on the Canadian albums chart and was certified gold by MC. Three singles were released from the album: "Saviour", "Ice" and "Second Go". In early 2010, Lights collaborated with various Canadian musicians on the charity single "Wavin' Flag" which reached number one in Canada and was certified triple platinum by MC.

Siberia, her second studio album, was released in October 2011. Featuring collaborations with Holy Fuck and Shad, it peaked at number three in Canada and was certified gold by MC. The album produced three singles, "Everybody Breaks a Glass", "Toes" and "Where the Fence Is Low". An acoustic album, Siberia Acoustic, followed in April 2013. Preceded by the single "Cactus in the Valley" with Owl City, the album reached number seven in Canada.

Her third studio album, Little Machines, was released in September 2014, and debuted at number five in Canada. It has spawned two official singles, the top-40 peaking lead single "Up We Go" and "Running with the Boys", as well as two promotional singles "Portal" and "Same Sea". In 2017, Lights released her fourth studio album, Skin & Earth, which debuted at number three on the Canadian albums chart. Its lead single, "Giants", became the first song of Lights' career to chart in the United States, peaking in the top 20 of the Adult Pop Songs airplay chart.

On June 11th, 2020, she released a seven track instrumental synthwave album on Bandcamp titled How to Sleep When You're on Fire. Proceeds from this album would be donated to the Black Lives Matter Vancouver branch.

Albums

Studio albums

Acoustic albums

Extended plays

Singles

As lead artist

As featured artist

Promotional singles

Other charted songs

Other appearances

Music videos

Notes

References

External links
 
 

Discography
Discographies of Canadian artists
Pop music discographies